Bernard Maurice Jones II (born 1979) is a  United States district judge of the United States District Court for the Western District of Oklahoma and a former magistrate judge of the same court.

Early life and education 

Jones was born in northeast Oklahoma City, and attended Bishop McGuinness High School. Jones earned his Bachelor of Arts from Southern Methodist University and his Juris Doctor from Notre Dame Law School.

Career 

Jones was in private practice, where he focused on commercial and labor and employment law, first at Porter Wright Morris & Arthur, LLP in Columbus, Ohio, and later in the Oklahoma City office of McAfee & Taft.

State court service 

In 2012, he was appointed as a District Judge for Oklahoma's Seventh Judicial District, where he presided over the family and domestic relations and civil dockets and oversaw the District's Drug Court and Mental Health Court programs.

A case Jones presided over drew national attention in 2014 when he ultimately denied a request by an Oklahoma school district to replay a high school football game that was allegedly botched by referees, noting that it was not up to the court to intervene in such a decision.

Federal judicial service 

Jones was appointed as a United States magistrate judge in 2015, and was sworn into office on August 17, 2015. He was the first African American to be appointed to this position in the state of Oklahoma. His service as a magistrate judge was terminated on December 31, 2019 when he was elevated to district judge.

On October 2, 2019, President Donald Trump announced his intent to nominate Jones to serve as a United States district judge for the United States District Court for the Western District of Oklahoma. On October 17, 2019, his nomination was sent to the Senate. Jones was nominated to the seat vacated by Judge Joe L. Heaton, who assumed senior status on July 1, 2019. On October 30, 2019, a hearing on his nomination was held before the Senate Judiciary Committee. Oklahoma Senators James Lankford and Jim Inhofe released a statement supporting Jones' nomination. On November 21, 2019, his nomination was reported out of committee by a 19–3 vote. On December 18, 2019, the United States Senate invoked cloture on his nomination by a 88–5 vote. On December 19, 2019, his nomination was confirmed by a 91–3 vote. He received his judicial commission on December 31, 2019.

See also 
 List of African-American federal judges
 List of African-American jurists

References

External links 

1979 births
Living people
Date of birth missing (living people)
Place of birth missing (living people)
20th-century American lawyers
21st-century American judges
African-American judges
African-American lawyers
Judges of the United States District Court for the Western District of Oklahoma
Lawyers from Oklahoma City
Notre Dame Law School alumni
Ohio lawyers
Oklahoma lawyers
Oklahoma state court judges
Southern Methodist University alumni
United States district court judges appointed by Donald Trump
United States magistrate judges